Gregory Villa is an American former soccer forward who played professionally in the North American Soccer League and Major Indoor Soccer League.  He earned eighteen caps, scoring five goals, with the United States men's national soccer team between 1977 and 1980.

Youth
Villa grew up in Saint Louis, Missouri, where he attended Mehlville High School from 1971 to 1975.  He also played for the Busch Soccer Club as a youth player.  Villa attended Southern Illinois University Edwardsville.  In 1975, he scored 9 goals and assisted on 8 others.  The next season, he led the team with 14 goals.

Professional
Villa played for the Minnesota Kicks from 1977 to 1979.  The Strikers traded Villa to the Tulsa Roughnecks only a few games into the 1979 season.  At the end of the season, the Roughnecks traded him to the Fort Lauderdale Strikers for the 1980 season.  At the completion of the 1980 NASL season, he signed with the St. Louis Steamers of Major Indoor Soccer League (MISL).  He played two seasons with the Steamers before trying out for Team America after being waived by the Chicago Sting without playing a game with them.  In 1983, the U.S. Soccer Federation entered the U.S. national team in NASL.  Team America ended the season 10-20 and USSF withdrew it from the league at the end of the season.  Villa played one more season with the Steamers in 1985–1986.

National team
Villa earned eighteen caps with the national team from 1977 to 1980.  His first game with the national team came in a September 15, 1977, victory over El Salvador.  Villa scored in the game, putting him in the company of about a dozen U.S. players who have scored in their debut with the national team.  Villa went on to play nearly every national team game during the next three years.  He also was a member of the U.S. Olympic Soccer Team which qualified for the 1980 Summer Olympics.  However, due to President Carter's boycott of the games, held in the Soviet Union, Villa did not play in the Olympics

References

External links
 NASL/MISL stats

1956 births
American soccer players
Kansas City Comets (original MISL) players
Living people
Major Indoor Soccer League (1978–1992) players
Minnesota Kicks players
North American Soccer League (1968–1984) players
People from Madison County, Illinois
St. Louis Steamers (original MISL) players
Tulsa Roughnecks (1978–1984) players
Team America (NASL) players
Fort Lauderdale Strikers (1977–1983) players
SIU Edwardsville Cougars men's soccer players
United States men's international soccer players
Soccer players from St. Louis
Association football forwards